The 2019 Kennesaw State Owls football team represented Kennesaw State University in the 2019 NCAA Division I FCS football season. They were led by fifth-year head coach Brian Bohannon and played their home games at Fifth Third Bank Stadium in Kennesaw, Georgia as fifth-year members of the Big South Conference. They finished the season 11–3, 5–1 in Big South play to finish in second place. The Owls received an at-large bid to the FCS Playoffs. They defeated Wofford in the first round before losing to Weber State in the second round.

Previous season

The Owls finished the 2018 season 11–2, 5–0 in Big South play to win the Big South conference championship for the second consecutive year. The Owls received the Big South's automatic bid to the FCS Playoffs. The Owls earned a No. 4 seed and a first round bye. They defeated Wofford in the second round before losing in the quarterfinals to No. 5 South Dakota State.

Preseason

Big South poll
In the Big South preseason poll released on July 21, 2019, the Owls were predicted to finish in first place.

Preseason All–Big South team
The Owls had six players selected to the preseason all-Big South team.

Defense

Desmond Johnson – DL

Andrew Butcher – DL

Bryson Armstrong – LB

Dorian Walker – DB

Cincere Mason – DB

Special teams

Isaac Foster – KR/PR

Schedule

Game summaries

Point

at Kent State

at Alabama State

at Missouri State

Reinhardt

Charleston Southern

at Presbyterian

North Alabama

Monmouth

at Campbell

at Hampton

Gardner–Webb

FCS Playoffs
The Owls were selected for the postseason tournament, with a first-round pairing against Wofford.

at Wofford–First Round

at Weber State–Second Round

Ranking movements

References

Kennesaw State
Kennesaw State Owls football seasons
Kennesaw State
Kennesaw State Owls football